Captain Thomas Wiggin (1601–1666), often known as Governor Thomas Wiggin, was the first governor of the Upper Plantation of New Hampshire, a settlement that later became part of the Province of New Hampshire in 1679.  He was the founder of Stratham, Rockingham, New Hampshire, which celebrated its 300th anniversary of incorporation in 2016.  The son of a vicar in the Church of England with  family ties to important and influential families of the era.  A highly respected man in his own right who would leave his stamp on what would become American values.

Three of his children survived: Andrew, Mary and Thomas. His son Andrew married Hannah Bradstreet, the daughter of Governor Simon Bradstreet of the Massachusetts Colony; his son Thomas' daughter Sarah Wiggin married into the family of John Sherburne of Portsmouth, New Hampshire.

Life
Thomas Wiggin first appears in colonial records as a signatory to the Wheelwright Deed in May 1629.  This document, which some historians, in response to the American Civil War, have claimed is a forgery, lays out an alliance with the sagamores of the Algonquins for mutual defense and to transfer land along the seacoast of present-day New Hampshire from the local Indians to a group of English colonists led by Reverend John Wheelwright.  Thomas Wiggin arrived in New England on the Winthrop Fleet. By 1631 he had been appointed by the proprietors of the "Upper" or "Dover" Plantation (comprising modern-day Dover, Durham and Stratham) to be their chief agent or governor.  He settled in what is now Stratham.  He was also the holder of the large Squamscott patent, covering land east of the mouth of the Squamscott River, and was a close ally of Governor John Winthrop of the neighboring Massachusetts Bay Colony.  In 1632 he traveled to England, and returned the following year with expanded powers and 30 Puritan settlers.  Wiggin acted as governor of the plantation until its inhabitants established a more formal government in 1637 and elected George Burdett as governor.  During this time the Dover plantation was divided along religious lines, with the 1633 Puritan arrivals disagreeing with the early Anglican settlers.

When Massachusetts authorities asserted territorial claims over the New Hampshire plantations in the early 1640s, Wiggin represented them in the colonial assembly, and eventually rose to become a member of the Massachusetts council of assistants.

During the administration of Governor Edward Cranfield in the 1680s, Wiggin and his son Thomas Wiggin Jr. joined other New Hampshire residents in signing a petition to King James II of England protesting attempts of the heirs of John Mason to reclaim territories and properties appropriated by colonists after Mason's death.

Wiggin was a Puritan and extremely religious. He ascribed fervently to the belief that the Anglican Church had to be cleansed of Catholic theology and ritual. He was convinced that God would punish England for its heresy, and believed that English Puritans needed to create a New England in a new world.

In June 1659, his son Andrew Wiggin married Hannah Bradstreet, daughter of Massachusetts Governor Simon Bradstreet and Anne Dudley (daughter of Massachusetts Governor Thomas Dudley).  Thomas Wiggin died in 1687, and was buried near his home.

More Information
For more information see the book "Echo Me the Life and Times of Captain Thomas Wiggin 1601-1666, the Making of American Values," by Joyce Wiggin-Robbins, published in 2016 by Exlibris Publishers.

References

Wadleigh. Notable Events in the History of Dover, New Hampshire
Lewis Company. Genealogical and Family History of New Hampshire, Volume 3

External links
Dover Library:The Many Names of Dover

1601 births
1666 deaths
Colonial governors of New Hampshire
People from Stratham, New Hampshire